Laura Marie Breckenridge (born August 22, 1983) is an American actress. She is known for her role as college student Rose Sorelli on the television series Related.

Early life
Breckenridge was born August 22, 1983 in Flourtown, Pennsylvania to John and Diane Breckenridge.

Career
She trained as a dancer with The Rock School for Dance Education, the School of American Ballet in New York City, and the Royal Ballet in London. As a teenager she began appearing in films and television programs, beginning with a minor role in Went to Coney Island on a Mission from God... Be Back by Five (1998) as the twelve-year-old Gabby. Additional minor TV roles followed in 2001 for The Jersey and Boston Public. She spent her high school years between work and school, making time for a social life in between gigs. She attended Professional Children's School in New York City.

In February 2002, Breckenridge landed a role on Broadway in a revival of Arthur Miller's The Crucible, appearing alongside Laura Linney, Liam Neeson, and Kristen Bell. The production ran for 101 performances from March 7 to June 9. In the fall of 2002, Breckenridge began her studies at Princeton University, soon joining the BodyHype Dance Company and getting involved in the theater scene on campus. In her sophomore year, she took her first break from school to appear in the Off-Broadway play The Moonlight Room.

In 2005, Breckenridge appeared in her first major film role as Bell Granger in Southern Belles. That same year, she made her debut on The WB's Related as college student Rose Sorelli. She would end up starring in nineteen episodes of that television series. In 2006, she played the role of Colins in the film Loving Annabelle, about a Catholic school student who falls in love with her female teacher. Breckenridge also appeared in the films Let Them Chirp Awhile (2007) as Dara, The Favor (2007) as Young Caroline, Beautiful Loser (2008) as Tracy, and Amusement (2008) as Shelby Leds.

In 2008, after a four-year sabbatical from school, she returned to Princeton to complete her studies while continuing her acting career. In 2010, she graduated from Princeton with a Bachelor of Arts degree in Classics.

During these years, Breckenridge appeared in three episodes of the popular television series Gossip Girl (2009), as well as the television series Drop Dead Diva (2010) as Dawn Lucas, and CSI: Crime Scene Investigation as Julie Crenshaw.

In 2011, Breckenridge guest starred on Grey's Anatomy in the role of Julia. Later that year, she starred in the holiday film A Christmas Kiss, which first aired on December 11, 2011 on the Ion Television network.

In 2012, Breckenridge continued her work on television series, including CSI: NY in the episode "Clean Sweep" as Lisa Roberts, The Mob Doctor in the episode "Legacy" as Sara Anderson, and Blue Bloods in the episode "Higher Education" as Dana. In 2013, she again played the role of Dana on Blue Bloods in the episode "Mistaken Identity".

Filmography

Film

Television

References

External links

 
 
 

1983 births
20th-century American actresses
21st-century American actresses
Actresses from Pennsylvania
American child actresses
American film actresses
American stage actresses
American television actresses
Living people
People from Springfield Township, Montgomery County, Pennsylvania
Princeton University alumni